Le Mesnil-Saint-Denis is a commune in the Yvelines department in the Île-de-France region in north-central France.

Demographics

Schools
The commune has two public preschools, Maternelle de Champmesnil and Maternelle du Bois du Fay, as well as two public elementary schools, Élémentaire de Champmesnil and Élémentaire du Bois du Fay. It also hosts two junior high schools, the public Collège Philippe de Champaigne and the private Collège privé Saint Thérèse. Collège Philippe de Champaigne also serves residents of La Verrière.

Twin towns
 Hankensbüttel, Germany since 1983

See also
Communes of the Yvelines department

References

External links

Home page 

Communes of Yvelines